Perarthrus is a genus of beetles in the family Cerambycidae, containing the following species:

 Perarthrus linsleyi (Knull, 1942)
 Perarthrus pallida (Schaeffer, 1905)
 Perarthrus vittatus LeConte, 1851

References

Trachyderini
Cerambycidae genera